Balonmano Bera Bera is a Spanish women's handball club from San Sebastián representing rugby club Bera Bera RT in División de Honor since 1998. It was previously known as Corteblanco Bidebieta, having played in top-flight since 1989.

Bera Bera has won eight spanish championships and six national cups, and is a regular of European competitions. Its best result to date was reaching the Cup Winners' Cup's semifinals in 2008 after beating Budućnost Podgorica and KIF Vejen, and qualifying for the Champions League group stage in 2013–14.

Club's names
Sociedad Cultural Recreativa Deportiva Bidebieta – (1983–1998)
Balonmano Bera Bera – (1998–)

Sponsors
Corteblanco – (1989–1998)
Meyba – (1990–91)
Akaba – (1999–2010)
Super Amara – (2016–present)

Season to season
As Bidebieta:

As Balonmano Bera Bera:

34 seasons in División de Honor

Trophies
 División de Honor: 8
2012–13, 2013–14, 2014–15, 2015–16, 2017–18, 2019–20, 2020–21, 2021–22
 Copa de la Reina: 6
2007, 2009, 2013, 2014, 2015–16, 2018–19
 Supercopa de España: 7
2007, 2012, 2013, 2014, 2015, 2016, 2018

European record

Team

Current squad
Squad for the 2022–23 season

Goalkeepers
 1  Alice Fernandes da Silva
 16  Maddi Aalla
Wingers
RW
 15  Maitane Etxeberria
 25  Anne Erauskin
LW
 7  Sara Gil de la Vega
 13  Laura Hernández
 00  Marie Louis
Line players
 31  Giuliana Gavilan
 42  Cristina Polonio

Back players
LB
 4  Mariane Fernándes 
 22  June Loidi
 00  Elke Karsten
CB
 3  Esther Arrojería
 9  Emma Boada
RB
 8  Alba Menéndez
 14  Malena Cavo 
 23  Paula Arcos

Transfers
Transfers for the 2022-2024 season

Joining

Leaving
 Paula Arcos (LB/RB) (from  Rapid Bucuresti)?

Technical staff
  Head Coach: Imanol Álvarez
  Assistant Coach: Eider Rubio

Notable players 

  Nely Carla Alberto
  Azenaide Carlos
  Mihaela Ciobanu
  Lígia Costa
  Verónica Cuadrado
  Fabiana Diniz
  Patricia Elorza
  Beatriz Fernández
  Alicia Fernández Fraga
  Tatiana Garmendia
  Amélie Goudjo
  Anette Hoffmann
  Janne Kolling
  Alexandra Lacrabère
  Marta López
  Ana Martínez
  Antonela Mena
  Wendy Obein
  Svetlana Obucina
  Darly de Paula
  Elisabeth Pinedo
  Montserrat Puche
  Anna Punko
  Fernanda da Silva
  Ana Temprano
  Raphaëlle Tervel
  Katarina Tomašević
  Tania Yáñez

References

External links

Basque handball clubs
Sports teams in San Sebastián
Handball clubs established in 1983
Spanish handball clubs